Sahir Ali Bagga is a Pakistani singer, music director and composer from Lahore. This is his discography.

Albums
Bagga has worked on the following albums throughout his career.

Soundtracks

Pakistani TV serials

Pakistan film industry

Bollywood

Singles

Pakistani

Coke Studio (Pakistan)

See also 
 Atif Aslam discography
 Ali Zafar discography
 Rahat Fateh Ali Khan discography

References 

Discographies of Pakistani artists
Pop music discographies
Rock music discographies